Crocus cambessedesii  is a species of flowering plant in the genus Crocus of the family Iridaceae. It is a cormous perennial native to Baleares (Majorca, Minorca).

References

cambessedesii